Swamulavaari Lingotam is a village in Nalgonda district in Telangana, India. It falls under Nampally Mandal, Telangana, India 508373.

References

Political Leaders:-
Sarpanch : Angirekula Pandu (He won the Lingotam Sarpanch seat  by a margin of 21 votes. He contested on a ticket from Indian National Congress Party. Opponent- Bekkam Ramesh (TRS))

Sarpanch :  Angirekula Pandu

MLA         : Komatireddy Rajagopal Reddy

M.P          : Komatireddy Venkat Reddy

Villages in Nalgonda district